James William Douglas (1851 – November 7, 1883) was a Canadian who represented Victoria City in the Legislative Assembly of British Columbia from 1875 to 1878.

He was born in Victoria, British Columbia, the son of Sir James Douglas, the first governor of Vancouver Island, and Amelia Connolly. James had been born in 
British Guiyana to a Scottish planter father and a free woman of colour. Amelia was the Anglo-Métis daughter of William Connolly, fur trader, and his Cree wife; she grew up at the Hudson Bay Company forts managed by her father.

Douglas was educated in Victoria. He served in the local militia. For a time, he studied law with John Foster McCreight. In 1877, Douglas married Mary, the daughter of Andrew Charles Elliott. He died in San Francisco at the age of 32.

References 

1851 births
1883 deaths
Politicians from Victoria, British Columbia
Independent MLAs in British Columbia
Canadian people of Scottish descent
Canadian people of Barbadian descent
Canadian people of Guyanese descent
Black Canadian politicians
History of Black people in British Columbia